Do You Know the Muffin Man? is a 1989 American made-for-television drama film starring Pam Dawber, John Shea, Stephen Dorff, Brian Bonsall, Anthony Geary and Dee Dee Rescher, directed by Gilbert Cates.

The film, about child abuse in a community day care center, was ranked as the 8th most-watched television program of the week by the Nielsen Ratings after its initial airing on CBS on October 22, 1989. It was released at the height of the day-care sex-abuse hysteria in the United States.

Cast 
Pam Dawber - Kendra Dollison 
John Shea - Roger Dollison 
Brian Bonsall - Teddy Dollison 
Stephen Dorff - Sandy Dollison

References

External links

1989 television films
1989 films
1989 drama films
American docudrama films
Films about child sexual abuse
Drama films based on actual events
Films directed by Gilbert Cates
Films scored by Lee Holdridge
CBS network films
American drama television films
1980s American films